WNCL (930 AM, "Cool 102.1/930") is a radio station licensed to Milford, Delaware. Owned by Forever Media, it broadcasts a classic hits format serving Dover, Delaware. It is simulcast on FM translator 102.1 W271CX in Milford.

History
Before ESPN, the then-WYUS 930 used to air a Spanish language Contemporary Hit Radio music format called "La Exitosa".

WYUS 930 also broadcasts from a translator located in Milford DE on 102.1 FM with 250 watts.

The station was assigned the WYUS call sign by the Federal Communications Commission on September 2, 1982.

In late-October 2019, the station dropped ESPN Radio, and flipped to classic hits as Cool 102.1/930. The format and branding originated from sister station WNCL, which had begun to transition to the country music format The Chicken. WYUS also adopted the WNCL calls.

Translators

References

External links
Cool 102.1 & 930 Facebook

NCL
Radio stations established in 1968
1968 establishments in Delaware